Optima is a town in Texas County, Oklahoma, United States. The population was 356 at the 2010 census.

Geography
Optima is located approximately nine miles northeast of Guymon on U.S. Route 54 in the Oklahoma Panhandle. The course of the Beaver River runs about two miles south of the community and enters Optima Lake about nine miles to the southeast.

Demographics

2010
As of the 2010 census Optima had a population of 356.  The ethnic makeup of the population was 76.1% Hispanic, 20.2% non-Hispanic white, 1.4% Native American and 4.8% reporting two or more race.

As of 2010, the Hispanic population is 76.1% - 66.3% Mexican, 0.3% Colombian, 0.3% Cuban.

2000
As of the census of 2000, there were 266 people, 78 households, and 64 families residing in the town. There were 97 housing units at an average density of 224.8 per square mile (87.1/km2). The racial makeup of the town was 79.32% White, 0.75% African American, 0.38% Native American, 0.75% Asian, 13.53% from other races, and 5.26% from two or more races. Hispanic or Latino of any race were 48.12% of the population.

There were 78 households, out of which 56.4% had children under the age of 18 living with them, 73.1% were married couples living together, and 17.9% were non-families. 16.7% of all households were made up of individuals, and 2.6% had someone living alone who was 65 years of age or older. The average household size was 3.41 and the average family size was 3.84.

In the town, the population was spread out, with 39.5% under the age of 18, 11.3% from 18 to 24, 32.3% from 25 to 44, 12.4% from 45 to 64, and 4.5% who were 65 years of age or older. The median age was 25 years. For every 100 females, there were 116.3 males. For every 100 females age 18 and over, there were 120.5 males.

The median income for a household in the town was $36,094, and the median income for a family was $40,833. Males had a median income of $28,750 versus $21,667 for females. The per capita income for the town was $12,388. About 11.4% of families and 11.9% of the population were below the poverty line, including 11.0% of those under the age of 18 and none of those 65 or over.

References

Towns in Texas County, Oklahoma
Towns in Oklahoma
Oklahoma Panhandle